Zanola fieldi is a moth in the family Apatelodidae. It was described by William Schaus in 1910. It is found in Costa Rica.

References

Apatelodidae
Moths described in 1910